Rafsanjan Airport  is an airport in Rafsanjan, Iran.

This Airport is located in Rafsanjan city, Kerman province of Iran. It is a medium airport and it is suitable for domestic flights. This airport has dedicated a service for the comfort of passengers going to and from the airport.

Airlines and destinations

References

Airports in Iran
Buildings and structures in Kerman Province
Transportation in Kerman Province